The Alaska Veterans Memorial is an outdoor memorial grove in Denali State Park in Interior Alaska. The memorial honors Army, Navy, Air Force, Marine Corps, Coast Guard, Alaska National Guard, and Merchant Marine veterans from Alaska, as well as specific Alaskans who were awarded the Medal of Honor. There are also small memorials to the passengers and crew of military plane crashes in Alaska. The site was selected because of the scenic beauty of the area and its location between Alaska's two largest cities. On a clear day visitors can see Denali from just outside the memorial. During the main visitor season (May–August) there is a staffed visitor center and bookstore. The main memorial alcove was constructed in 1983, Governor Bill Sheffield, himself a veteran, dedicated the site in 1984.

Main memorial

While approaching the alcove, visitors pass by small memorials honoring individual Alaskans who were awarded the Medal of Honor, including James Leroy Bondsteel, who lived in Houston, Alaska after retiring from active duty.

The main alcove of the memorial consists of five  upright concrete slabs, each with a large star cut through the upper section and a description of a branch of the Armed Forces history in Alaska inscribed on the lower section. An inscribed plaque at the entrance honors the Alaska National Guard and the unpaid volunteers of the Alaska Territorial Guard, which filled in for the National Guard when it was mobilized during World War Two. The sculpture at the front of the alcove depicts two members of the Territorial Guard watching for threats with binoculars.

Plane crash memorials

Two military plane crashes in Alaska are also memorialized outside of the alcove. In February 1954 a  C-47 crashed into a mountain, killing 10 of the 16 aboard. In November 1957 a TB-29 Superfortress stationed at Elmendorf Air Force Base strayed off course in bad weather and crashed in the Talkeetna Mountains, killing 6 of the 10 crew aboard at the time. One of the survivors was awarded the Soldiers Medal for his lifesaving actions while the survivors awaited rescue.

References

Buildings and structures in Matanuska-Susitna Borough, Alaska
Monuments and memorials in Alaska
Outdoor sculptures in Alaska
Tourist attractions in Matanuska-Susitna Borough, Alaska
Concrete sculptures in the United States
Statues in Alaska
1983 establishments in Alaska